Euphorbia psammogeton, commonly known as sand spurge, is a flowering plant in the family Euphorbiaceae. The specific epithet derives from the Greek psammos (“sand”) and geiton (“neighbour”), alluding to the typical habitat.

Description
E. psammogeton is a smooth, mat-forming, perennial herb, often with a woody rootstock. It has articulated, prostrate stems, growing to 35 cm or more. Its oblong to broadly elliptic leaves are 1–3 cm long and 0.5–1.5 cm wide, and asymmetric at the base. The tiny flower-heads are surrounded by white leaf-like bracts. Each flower-head consists of a female flower surrounded by up to five sets of tiny male flowers. The fruiting capsule is smooth and about 2 mm long.  It flowers in spring/summer and fruits in autumn/winter.

Distribution and habitat
The plant is endemic to Australia; it is found along the coast of New South Wales and south-eastern Queensland, as well as on subtropical Lord Howe Island in the Tasman Sea. It occurs in sandy coastal habitats, such as coastal dunes, and on beaches above high tide level. It is listed as endangered in New South Wales.

Taxonomy
Euphorbia psammogeton was first described by Green (1993) as Euphorbia psammogeton. This was amended to Chamaesyce psammogeton by Forster and Henderson in 1995 and was returned to the genus Euphorbia by Halford in 2012, giving it the currently accepted name of Euphorbia psammogeton.

Conservation status
It is listed as endangered under the Biodiversity Conservation Act 2016.

Notes

References

psammogeton
Flora of Lord Howe Island
Flora of New South Wales
Flora of Queensland
Plants described in 1993
Malpighiales of Australia